Jamtsyn Bor (born 24 March 1958) is a Mongolian wrestler. He competed in the men's Greco-Roman 90 kg at the 1980 Summer Olympics.

References

External links 
 

1958 births
Living people
Mongolian male sport wrestlers
Olympic wrestlers of Mongolia
Wrestlers at the 1980 Summer Olympics
Place of birth missing (living people)
Asian Games medalists in wrestling
Asian Games silver medalists for Mongolia
Wrestlers at the 1978 Asian Games
Medalists at the 1978 Asian Games
20th-century Mongolian people
21st-century Mongolian people